Winder may refer to:

Mechanical devices
 Winding machine, a machine for wrapping string, twine, cord, thread, yarn, rope, wire, ribbon, tape, etc. onto a spool, bobbin, reel, etc.
 Winder or motor drive, a device for automatically (re-) winding film in a manual camera
 Winder or hoist, used in underground mining
 A device for transferring energy into a mechanical storage such as mainsprings

Places
 Winder, Cumbria, a location in the United Kingdom
 Winder, Georgia, United States
 Winder, Idaho, United States
 Winder Dam, a dam on the Winder River in Lasbela District, Balochistan, Pakistan
 Winder, a union council in Lasbela District, Balochistan, Pakistan
 Lake Winder, Florida, United States, United States
 Ray Winder Field, a baseball park in Little Rock, Arkansas

People
 Winder (surname), including list of persons bearing the name
 Winder (given name), including list of persons with the name

Other uses
 Winder (band), a German-Danish band, active between 1984 and 1985
 Winder (step), a type of stairway step
 Winder Farms, online grocer
 USS PCS-1376, US Navy ship given the name Winder toward the end of its period of service
 Westchester Interfaith/Interagency Network for Disaster and Emergency Recovery, a disaster recovery organization in Westchester County, New York
 Winder Building, an office building in Washington, D.C., on the National Register of Historic Places

See also
 Winner (disambiguation)